Nanur Rural District is a rural district (dehestan) in Nanur District, Baneh County, Kurdistan Province, Iran. At the 2006 census, its population was 3,104, in 540 families. The rural district has 15 villages.

References 

Rural Districts of Kurdistan Province
Baneh County